State Road 265 (SR 265) is a short north–south route in Tallahassee.

Route description
SR 265 runs along Magnolia Drive from U.S. Route 27 (US 27; Apalachee Parkway) north to Seventh Avenue, crossing US 90 (Tennessee Street).  North of Miccosukee Road (County Road 146 or CR 146), the road continues past Tallahassee Memorial Hospital. At the intersection with Seventh Avenue and the hospital entrance, Centerville Road continues as CR 151.

History
SR 265 was established by January 1980 running along the same routing it does today. By October 1993, the state highway was extended south and west along Magnolia Drive to end at SR 61 south of downtown Tallahassee. Currently, signage along this portion of the road at its two endpoints show this road as County Road 265 (CR 265). Some agencies show this portion of the road as a county road, such as Tallahassee Public Works, while others, such as Florida Department of Transportation's GIS data hub, do not list it as a county road.

Major intersections

References

External links

FDOT Map of Leon County (including SR 265)

265
265
265